Benzyl bromide is an organic compound with the formula .  The molecule consists of a benzene ring substituted with a bromomethyl group. It is a colorless liquid with lachrymatory properties.  The compound is a reagent for introducing benzyl groups.

Synthesis and structure
Benzyl bromide can be synthesized by the bromination of toluene under conditions suitable for a free radical halogenation:

The structure has been examined by electron diffraction.

Applications
Benzyl bromide is used in organic synthesis for the introduction of the benzyl groups when the less expensive benzyl chloride is insufficiently reactive.
 Benzylations are often achieved in the presence of catalytic amounts of sodium iodide, which generates the more reactive benzyl iodide in situ. In some cases, benzyl serves as protecting group for alcohols and carboxylic acids.

Safety
Benzyl bromide is a strong lachrymator and is also intensely irritating to skin and mucous membranes. Because of these properties, it has been used in chemical warfare, both in combat and in training due to its irritating yet non-lethal nature.

See also 
 Benzyl chloride
 Benzyl fluoride
 Benzyl iodide

References 

Organobromides
Benzyl compounds
Lachrymatory agents